Rotherby is a village and former civil parish,  north east of Leicester, now in the parish of Hoby with Rotherby, in the Melton district, in the county of Leicestershire, England. In 1931 the parish had a population of 133.

Features 
Rotherby has a church called All Saints.

History 
Rotherby was recorded in the Domesday Book as Redebi. On 1 April 1936 the parish was abolished and merged with Brooksby, Hoby and Ragdale to form Hoby with Rotherby.

References 

Villages in Leicestershire
Former civil parishes in Leicestershire
Borough of Melton